Ryan Stewart may refer to:
 Ryan Stewart (American football) (born 1973), former American football safety
 Ryan Stewart (ice hockey) (born 1967), former ice hockey player
 Ryan Stewart (footballer) (born 1982), Trinidadian footballer
 Ryan Stewart (songwriter), Canadian songwriter and producer
 Ryan Stewart, a character portrayed by Jesse Plemons in the television series Cold Case